Moshannon is an unincorporated community and census-designated place (CDP) in Snow Shoe Township, Centre County, Pennsylvania, United States. As of the 2010 census, the population was 281 residents. Black Moshannon Creek, part of the West Branch Susquehanna River watershed, runs through a  valley half a mile (0.8 km) south of the town.

The community takes its name from Moshannon Creek, a Native American name purported to mean "moose stream".

Demographics

References

Census-designated places in Centre County, Pennsylvania
Census-designated places in Pennsylvania
Pennsylvania placenames of Native American origin